Al-Jalaa is a small city in eastern Syria, administratively part of the Deir ez-Zor Governorate, located along the Euphrates River, south of Deir ez-Zor. Nearby localities include al-Abbas to the west, al-Ramadi and Abu Kamal to the south and Kharayij and Hajin to the north. According to the Syria Central Bureau of Statistics, al-Jalaa had a population of 9,171 in the 2004 census. It is the administrative center of a nahiyah ("subdistrict") of the Abu Kamal District. The al-Jalaa subdistrict consists of six towns which had a collective population of 29,255 in 2004.

In the Syrian Civil War the city was occupied by ISIL until the Syrian army captured it on 5 December 2017.

References

Populated places in Abu Kamal District
Towns in Syria